Wainwright Dairy is a creamery established by Carl Wainwright in Live Oak, Florida. The dairy produces pasteurized but nonhomogenized cream-on-top milk and Colby cheese, pepper jack cheese, baby Swiss cheese, cheddar, and chipotle cheese. It was established in 2009. Their Baby Swiss, Marble Cheddar, Cheddar, Shard Cheddar, Chipotle Cheddar, Provolone, Mozzarella, Longhorn Cheddar and Muenster are available at the Tipple's Brews store in Gainesville.

References

External links
Wainwright Dairy website

2009 establishments in Florida
Dairy products companies of the United States
Manufacturing companies based in Florida
Food and drink companies based in Florida
Suwannee County, Florida
American companies established in 2009 
Food and drink companies established in 2009